Zieria adenodonta, commonly known as the Wollumbin zieria, is a plant in the citrus family Rutaceae and is endemic to eastern Australia.  It is a dense, bushy shrub with leaves composed of three leaflets which are warty on the upper surface. In winter and early spring it has groups of five to eight flowers, each with four white petals, the groups usually shorter than the leaves.

Description
The leaflets are dark green and warty on the upper surface, light green and not wary on the lower side. The edges of the leaflets are slightly rolled under and have small teeth. They have an unpleasant smell when crushed.

The flowers are white and are arranged in upper leaf axils, usually in groups of five to eight, but sometimes as many as 27. The groups are usually shorter than the leaves. In common with other zierias, there are only four stamens. Flowering occurs from May to September and is followed by the fruit which is a yellow-brown, egg-shaped capsule containing one black seed.

Taxonomy and naming
Wollumbin zieria was first formally described in 1875 by Ferdinand von Mueller who gave it the name Zieria granulata var. adenodonta and published the description in Fragmenta phytographiae Australiae. In 2002, James Armstrong raised it to species status and published the change in Australian Systematic Botany. The specific epithet (adenodonta) is derived from the Ancient Greek words aden meaning "gland" and odous meaning "tooth".

Distribution and habitat
Zieria adenodonta occurs in the Lamington National Park in Queensland and on Mount Warning in New South Wales, growing in dense shrubby vegetation on steep slopes.

Conservation
Wollumbin zieria is listed as "Endangered" under the New South Wales NSW Threatened Species Conservation Act.

References

External links
 

adenodonta
Sapindales of Australia
Flora of New South Wales
Flora of Queensland
Plants described in 1875
Taxa named by Ferdinand von Mueller